Philip Lowe (born 1961) is an Australian economist who is the current Governor of the Reserve Bank of Australia, having succeeded Glenn Stevens on 18 September 2016. He was previously deputy governor under Stevens from February 2012 to September 2016.

He lives in the Sydney suburb of Randwick, New South Wales.

Early life and education
Lowe was born in Wagga Wagga, New South Wales, as the eldest of five children in the family. He attended St Michael's High School and Trinity Senior High School. Lowe later moved to Sydney and was hired by the RBA straight out of high school. He was initially employed as a clerical worker in 1980 at the age of 17, while completing his undergraduate commerce degree at the University of New South Wales by attending night classes. He was awarded first-class honours and the University Medal on his graduation in 1985.

Lowe later completed a doctorate in 1994 at the Massachusetts Institute of Technology (MIT), with Paul Krugman as his adviser.

Career
In 1997, Lowe was appointed head of the RBA's Economic Research Department. He later headed the bank's Financial Stability Department (from 1999 to 2000), the Domestic Markets Department (from 2002 to 2003), and the Economic Analysis Department (from 2003 to 2004). From 2000 to 2002, Lowe worked at the Bank for International Settlements in Switzerland, as head of its Financial Institutions and Infrastructure Division. He was made Assistant Governor (Financial System) at the RBA in 2004, and Assistant Governor (Economic) in 2009, eventually becoming Deputy Governor in 2012. In May 2016, Scott Morrison (the Treasurer of Australia) announced that Lowe would succeed Glenn Stevens at the head of the RBA at the end of his term in September 2016.

Personal life
Lowe is married and has three children. He met his wife, Jocelyn Parker, who works at the Australian Prudential Regulation Authority, while working at the RBA.

References

1958 births
Living people
Australian economists
Massachusetts Institute of Technology alumni
People from Wagga Wagga
University of New South Wales alumni
Governors of the Reserve Bank of Australia